Hot Sugar may mean:
Hot Sugar (musician), an American record producer also known as Nick Koenig
"Hot Sugar" (song), a song by Tamar Braxton from Love and War
"Hot Sugar", a song by The Mooney Suzuki from Alive & Amplified
"Hot Sugar", a song by Glass Animals from Dreamland